Russell Aldridge (5 August 1831 – 27 August 1895) was an English first-class cricketer. Born at Christchurch, Hampshire, Aldridge made a single appearance in first-class cricket for the Marylebone Cricket Club against the Sussex in 1855 at E. Tredcroft's Ground, Horsham, scoring 3 runs during the match, which was won by Sussex. He died at St Pancras, London.

References

External links
Russell Aldridge at ESPNcricinfo
Russell Aldridge at CricketArchive

1831 births
1895 deaths
People from Christchurch, Dorset
Cricketers from Dorset
English cricketers
Marylebone Cricket Club cricketers